Live by Request is a live album by k.d. lang, released in 2001 (see 2001 in music). The album was recorded during the taping of the television show Live by Request on the A&E Network. The performance was on December 14, 2000 at the John Jay College of Criminal Justice in Midtown Manhattan.

Track listing 
 "Summerfling" (Lang, David Piltch) – 4:03
 "Big Boned Gal" (Lang, Ben Mink) – 2:55
 "Black Coffee" (Sonny Burke, Paul Francis Webster) – 3:44
 "Trail of Broken Hearts" (Lang, Ben Mink) – 3:19
 "Crying" (Joe Melson, Roy Orbison) – 4:32
 "Don't Smoke in Bed" (Willard Robison) – 3:44
 "The Consequences of Falling" (Marie-Claire D'Ubaldo, Rick Nowels, Billy Steinberg) – 3:55
 "Miss Chatelaine" (Lang, Ben Mink) – 3:25
 "Three Cigarettes in an Ashtray" (Eddie Miller, W.S. Stevenson) – 2:52
 "Barefoot" (Lang, Bob Telson) – 4:20
 "Constant Craving" (Lang, Ben Mink) – 4:32
 "Wash Me Clean" (Lang) – 3:50
 "Pullin' Back the Reins" (Lang, Ben Mink) – 4:41
 "Simple" (Lang, David Piltch) – 3:29

Personnel 
 k.d. lang - vocals
 Gregg Arreguin - guitar
 Teddy Borowiecki - keyboard
 Amy Keys - background vocals
 Abe Laboriel Jr. - drums
 Greg Leisz - guitar, pedal steel
 Kate Markowitz - background vocals
 David Piltch - bass
Windy Wagner (background vocals)

Production 
 Producer: Mitch Maketansky
 Executive producers: Danny Bennett, Andy Kadison, Paul Rappaport
 Mixing: David Thoener
 Repertoire: Mio Vukovic
 Director: Lawrence Jordan
 Lighting director: Dale Lynch
 Stage technician: Bobby Carlos
 Art direction: Mio Vukovic
 Design: Lawrence Azerrad

Charts

References

K.d. lang albums
2001 live albums
Warner Records live albums